Henry Paul Stokes (19 June 1920 – 10 April 1987) was a Scottish professional snooker and billiards player from Glasgow. He was Scottish Professional Snooker Champion in 1949, 1952 and 1953. He remained the Scottish Professional Champion until the event was restarted in 1980.

Career
In January 1936 Stokes reached the final of the English Boys' Billiards Championship, losing 618–750 to Donald Cruickshank at Burroughes Hall in London. Stokes turned professional soon afterwards and in January 1938 he lost 6321–7000 to Neil Canney in the final of the Scottish (Residential) Professional Billiards Championship In April Stokes lost 5336–7000 to Walter Donaldson in the Open event.

Stokes was Scottish Professional Snooker Champion in 1949, 1952 and 1953 and was the losing finalist in 1951. His  first Championship win was in Edinburgh in December 1949. There were four entries. Stokes beat Eddie Brown 6–5 in the second semi-final on 8 December. In the 21-frame final, played on 9 and 10 December, Stokes led Willie Newman, the holder, 8–2 after the first day and won 11–4 on the second afternoon.

The next Championship was held at the Nile Rooms in Glasgow in February 1951. There were three entries. Stokes beat Bob Martin 6–1 in the semi-final on 6 February. In the 21-frame final, played on 7 and 8 February, Eddie Brown led 7–3 after the first day and won 11–9 on the second evening. The 1952 Championship was held in Edinburgh in February that year. There were four entries. Stokes, beat J. Mitchell 6–1 in the second semi-final on 7 February. In the 21-frame final, played on 8 and 9 February, Stokes led Eddie Brown 6–4 after the first day and won 11–4 on the second afternoon, to regain the title. Stokes retained his title in 1953 when beat Eddie Brown 11–8 in the 21-frame event held at the Union Club in Glasgow on 20 and 21 March. They were the only two entries. This was to be the last Scottish Professional Championship until it restarted in 1980.

Stokes rarely entered the major English snooker tournaments but played in the 1954 World Professional Match-play Championship where he lost at the quarter-final stage to Fred Davis. He entered again in 1955 but lost to Jackie Rea. He also entered the 1954/1955 News of the World Snooker Tournament, playing in the qualifying stage in May 1954. Stokes beat Sydney Lee but lost to Kingsley Kennerley and didn't qualify for the main event.

References

Scottish snooker players
Scottish players of English billiards
1920 births
1987 deaths
Sportspeople from Glasgow